Exits is a 1979 Australian drama-documentary directed by [[Paul Davies (writer) Pat Laughren and Carolyn Howard). It centres on the effect of the 1975 dismissal of the Labor Government of Gough Whitlam on a handful of characters wandering around Melbourne.

EXITS

Contrasts the sacking of the Whitlam Labour Government on the 11th of November 1975 with the sacking of Anna, an usherette in an iconic Melbourne Cinema – The “National Theatre” in St. Kilda. As the shock of both events sink in, the usherette meets up with a journalist (George) in a pub and together they reflect on the absurdity of politics and the possibility of malign foreign actors in the dramatic events unfolding all around them. George explains a suspicion he has about the crossword puzzle in that day’s newspaper. He  believes it contains a covert hint that the gubernatorial coup (approved and assisted by British royalty and American counter-intelligence) is coming. As George and Anna continue to drift through the city and the rest of the day together (and perhaps, contemplate a relationship), the larger political events take their inevitable course and tend to overwhelm everything else. We get flashbacks to another November 11 event – the hanging of Ned Kelly - and also to various military parades associated with “Remembrance Day” (celebrating the conclusion of World War 1).  It reminds us that the Governor General who sacked Whitlam is also the nominal head of the army (as well as the nominal representative of a foreign monarch). The story ends in a moment of Orwellian confusion and paranoia as George returns home only to find his house emptied of all its contents. It leaves us with the feeling that perhaps he was onto something with the crossword puzzle after all ? …

REMEMBERING EXITS
AND 
NOVEMBER ELEVEN
Metro #150 (2006)
Paul Davies

“Remember Remembrance Day, remember November the Eleventh…” declares ‘George’ towards the end of EXITS - as both the dust and an uneasy dusk settles on one of the most dramatic days in Australia’s political history. Unfortunately, the skeptical taxi driver he urges it on sounds less than impressed, and is already wondering if he’s going to get the fare out of this bloke. 

A free lance journalist and full time conspiracy theorist, ‘George’ has finally reached a position where it seems the only hope he’s got of fighting back against the Whitlam sacking and what he sees as a gross miscarriage of constitutional justice is by resorting to catchy phrases, underscoring the irony, hoping his clever phraseology will somehow find a resonance into the future. Only a small consolation for the huge frustration and impotence he feels about events that were at best, a sub-optimal outcome for democracy. 

And herein lies one of George’s chief shortcomings. Sadly, he even wears a badge on his military/hippie-style jacket that says: “illusions”. Unable to take any form of concrete political action, and clearly suffering some kind of breakdown, he wanders the streets and laneways of Melbourne venting his feelings on complete strangers: one a stunned office worker in a suit, another a paper seller sitting below graffiti reading: “Past Present Futile” … convinced that what happened in Canberra that day was a coup d’etat, he demands to know “Why  there aren’t any tanks in the streets?” Again, without getting any sensible answer. 

George reacts badly to the circumstances that seem to have robbed him of ‘his government’ and thereby any hope for a decent, fair and sane future. It’s as if this somewhat paranoid character can see forward thirty years across the barren decades of economic irrationalism that are to follow. A generation in which Australia’s main political parties have became virtual carbon copies of each other. And where the sixties dream of a better, fairer, more tolerant and less violent world seems to have gone forever.

George meets Anna, just as she herself is getting the sack from the ‘National’ cinema where she works as an usher. They hang together for a while, sharing a beer and their differing views of the world. He reckons he’s found proof of the ‘conspiracy’ surrounding the coup in the cross word puzzles of a major metropolitan daily. Changing a government without a mandate is the same as an act of war. Fellow traitors have to be alerted, messages have to be sent out anonymously, timing is of the essence…

Anna seems a trifle underwhelmed by his paranoid view. Her response is that the personal is political, and has always been. You change things by taking action, organizing people. “Get moving,” she urges him, “who wants to be a stranger on a train?” – quoting an Eric Beach poem (who is also featured in the film). Anna is surprised that George is surprised. To her it’s how the world works. The bosses are always in control. To be sacked is to be humiliated. Put back in your place, whether you’re an usher or a prime minister. And with now no job to go to herself, she travels with George to St. Kilda beach…. where he’s still reeling, still shocked by events in Canberra. He wonders how you can ever really change things? When the forces of darkness always seem to be lurking round the corner, ready strike down any outbreak of genuine independence. Whitlam’s government was attempting to buy back the farm. If only it had been given a chance to do so…

Anna feels that it’s not enough just to react to events on the national stage. The only way to change things is at the micro level. This is the one place an ordinary person can affect change. Her resolve is to find the connections that unite people. Act together or not at all.

And so their feeble relationship peters out. Anna leaves George in front of Luna Park (appropriately) as she makes her own exit on a W-class Melbourne tram, with big Australian flags on the side. George finds his lonely way home only to discover his small cottage totally evacuated. Everything has been taken, his papers, books, possessions. Another mystery. Has he been followed? Will his stuff be used against him? Will his identity disappear like all his stuff? Another dissident intellectual to be eliminated under the new tyranny.

John Hughes and Andrew Scollo’s NOVEMBER ELEVEN deals with the same events and issues in a more ‘experimental’ way, playing with the key political images: repeating them to hammer home the point: there is Govenor General Kerr in top hat, inspecting the troops, there’s the American ambassador, sounding like LBJ and joking about the ‘peppercorn rent’ paid for the American base at Pine Gap - reinforcing the US presence in Australian politics - reinforcing the status of the Governor General as head of the armed forces, revisiting the loans affair as a series of media grabs. Was it all a set-up to destabilize Whitlam? Was the CIA involved? And who was Tireth Khemlani anyway? Where the hell did he come from and where is he now? 

It reminds us that there have been other “November Elevens” in our history. All involving in a curious, and sometimes circuitous way, the British Monarchy. All are dates that have been associated with tragedy and set backs. 

There was of course, the original Remembrance Day: marking the 11th Hour of the 11th Day of the 11th Month (of 1918), on which the horrendous slaughter in the trenches of the First World War was finally brought to an end. This was undoubtedly a good thing. But the “war to end all wars” failed spectacularly in that singular objective. This was meaningless sloganising too. A con to “pull the wool” as Eric Beach would say. 

There was also Nov 11th 1880, the date of Ned Kelly’s hanging in Old Melbourne Gaol, and the end of any potential, Irish-colonial backlash against the hegemony of the imperial power. 

Both these other November Elevens are referred to in Exits.  Kelly is there in snatches of scenes in the Old Melbourne gaol, (including his death mask) and alert viewers will find another image of him on a magazine, next to a ringing, but unaswered phone in the opening shot in George’s flat. 

Memories of other Wars that failed to be ended are there in the character of the homeless alcoholic, a man who George also encounters in the cinema, and who he subsequently befriends. The ‘digger’ character, in military coat and beret, is a decaying veteran of the Second World War (from the 2/14th battalion- one of the heroic regiments of the Kokoda campaign). George later returns to the digger’s “camp” - a mattress under a bit of scrounged roofing, a humpy located in one of Melbourne’s industrial wastelands. Here George raves on somewhat bizarrely and irrelevantly about the sad state of Australian television, beginning with the Logies… The digger eventually embodies both the Kelly and the Remembrance day motifs when he attempts to hang himself in the cinema’s gents’ toilet.

Like November Eleven, Exits mixes archival and documentary footage with bits of stand-up poetry (Eric Beach again) and the fractured narrative of George and Anna. Shot by the artist Paul Cavell on a clapped out Arri BL that had filmed a hundred  Homicides (all the gear was hired from Crawfords) Exits is a ‘no-budget’ film that also features music by Ken Schroeder and Paul Grabowski and stars the late Caz Howard, my partner later, and a wonderful Melbourne actor whose life was cut tragically short by cancer ten years later.

Like November eleven, Exits was conceived as a kind of ‘maintain your rage project’. What else could a filmmaker do? The two works premiered on Nov 11 1980 in the Pram Factory Basement - one of the last events to occur in that iconic space so central to the revival of Australian theatre. The subsequent closure of the Pram was a sign like many others, of how the cultural landscape was shifting during the Fraser years that followed the Dismissal. (The space is now a multiplex cinema and shopping arcade).

Exits was nominated for a Greater Union Award at the Sydney film festival, and was distributed by the AFI when it still did that sort of thing. You might be able to borrow a VHS or DVD copy of either film from the Film and Sound Archive. Apart from the TV series The Dismissal (Kennedy Miller) and the spoof musical, The Golden Years of Gough (by Albert Hunt), Exits and November Eleven are still the only films dealing with this major turning point in our journey as a nation.

Exits is the earliest of several treatments of the event, which include Home on the Range (Gil Scrine, 1982) and The Dismissal (1983).

References

1979 films
1975 Australian constitutional crisis
1970s Australian films